Nitendra Singh Rawat (born 29 September 1986) is an Indian marathon runner. He was selected to represent India at the 2016 Summer Olympics in Rio de Janeiro, in the men's marathon along with Gopi T. and Kheta Ram.

References

External links

1986 births
Living people
People from Bageshwar district
Athletes from Uttarakhand
Indian male marathon runners
Olympic athletes of India
Athletes (track and field) at the 2016 Summer Olympics
South Asian Games gold medalists for India
South Asian Games medalists in athletics
Athletes (track and field) at the 2022 Commonwealth Games
Commonwealth Games competitors for India